Manjeet Kaur (born 4 April 1982) is an Indian sprint athlete from Punjab who specializes in 400 metres. She held the 400 m National record of 51.05 seconds set at the National Circuit Athletic Meet held in Chennai on 16 June 2004. She broke the previous record held by K. M. Beenamol since November 2001. In doing so, she passed the qualifying mark for the 2004 Athens Olympics. She along with Chitra K. Soman, Rajwinder Kaur and K. M. Beenamol form the team that holds the current National record in 4 x 400 metres relay.

A Deputy Superintendent of Police (DSP) in the Punjab Police, Manjeet competed for India in 4 x 400 metres relay at 2004 Athens Olympics where her team set the current National record with a time of 3:26.89. The team finished third in their heats. In the next Beijing Olympics also she represented India in 4 x 400 metres relay where her team composed of Sathi Geetha, Chitra K. Soman, and Mandeep Kaur clocked a time of 3:28.83 and finished seventh in their heats.

In Doha Asian Games in 2006, Manjeet led India to a 4 x 400 metres relay gold. Earlier at the same event, she had also won a silver medal in Women's 400 metres race behind eventual winner Olga Tereshkova from Kazakhstan. In 2005, she was conferred the Arjuna Award for her contribution to the Indian athletics.

Manjeet Kaur won the Gold Medal at the 2010 Commonwealth Games in 4x400 m relay event with Mandeep Kaur, Sini Jose and Ashwini Akkunji.

References

External links
 
 

1982 births
Living people
Indian female sprinters
21st-century Indian women
21st-century Indian people
Olympic athletes of India
Athletes (track and field) at the 2004 Summer Olympics
Athletes (track and field) at the 2008 Summer Olympics
Asian Games gold medalists for India
Asian Games silver medalists for India
Asian Games medalists in athletics (track and field)
Athletes (track and field) at the 2002 Asian Games
Athletes (track and field) at the 2006 Asian Games
Athletes (track and field) at the 2010 Asian Games
Commonwealth Games gold medallists for India
Athletes (track and field) at the 2006 Commonwealth Games
Athletes (track and field) at the 2010 Commonwealth Games
Recipients of the Arjuna Award
Sportswomen from Punjab, India
Punjabi people
Commonwealth Games medallists in athletics
Medalists at the 2002 Asian Games
Medalists at the 2006 Asian Games
Medalists at the 2010 Asian Games
Olympic female sprinters
Medallists at the 2006 Commonwealth Games
Medallists at the 2010 Commonwealth Games